SMSS may refer to:

Session Manager Subsystem (smss.exe), a component of the Microsoft Windows NT operating system
Switching and Management Subsystem, in wireless communication technology
Squad Mission Support System, military robotic system developed by Western company Lockheed Martin
St. Margaret's Secondary School, a government-aided autonomous girls' secondary school in Bukit Timah, Singapore
Sailor Moon SuperS, the fourth season of the anime series Sailor Moon
 SkyMapper Sky Survey